The Learning Annex was an American education company based in New York City. It was founded in 1980 by Bill Zanker in his New York City studio apartment with a $5,000 investment.

The Learning Annex offered a wide range of classes on diverse topics such as "How to Develop & Write a Winning Business Plan", “How To Manufacture Your Products”, “How to Sing Professionally”, “Hair how-to by Frederic Fekkai”, "Intro to Pole Dancing", "How to Write a Book Proposal That Publishers Can't Refuse", "How to Talk to Your Cat", "How to Buy Foreclosed Property", "Make Contact with Lost Loved Ones", "How to Shoot Your Own Live Adult Video", "Kabbalah-Dating", "How to Create Magical Spells", "Discover Your Past Lives - Who Were You Before?", "How to Make Your Own Soap", and "How to Marry the Rich".

The Learning Annex achieved pop culture status with references to it appearing on Sex and the City and other television shows as well as being a subject of monologues and a component of movie and television plots.

In 1991, Zanker filed for bankruptcy and sold the Learning Annex. He repurchased it in 2002. 

In 2006, the company started offering "Real Estate Wealth Expo" events featuring prominent speakers such as George Foreman, Donald Trump, televangelist Paula White, and motivational speaker Tony Robbins.  Trump was reported to have received $1.5 million for each of the 17 one-hour presentations he did for The Learning Annex's "real estate wealth expos" in 2006 and 2007. In a court deposition two years later, Trump admitted that he was paid $400,000.

The Learning Annex was No. 346 on the 2007 Inc. 5000 (a list of the nation's fastest-growing private companies) with a reported three year growth of 794.1%, revenue of $102 million, and 114 employees. Later in 2007, it ceased its operations in Toronto, Canada.

In 2023, the New York Times reported that the Learning Annex had "gone dark".

References

External links

Academic organizations based in the United States
Education companies of the United States
Privately held companies based in New York (state)
1980 establishments in New York City
American companies established in 1980
Educational institutions established in 1980